Nemanja Ćalasan (born 17 March 1996) is a Serbian professional footballer who plays as a centre back for Portuguese club Leixões.

Club career

Spartak Subotica
Ćalasan started his career with Spartak Subotica, where he passed all youth selections. In 2014, he moved to local football club Bačka 1901, where he spent the 2014–15 season in the Serbian League Vojvodina. Next summer, he has joined the first team of Spartak Subotica, but shortly after he returned to Bačka 1901, this time as a loaned player until the end of 2015–16 season. At the beginning of 2016, Ćalasan signed his first professional contract with Spartak Subotica, and in summer of the same year, he became a regular member of the first squad. He started the 2016–17 season paired with Aleksandar Radovanović on the stopper places. After several goals for Bačka 1901 during the 2015–16 season in the Serbian League Vojvodina, Ćalasan scored his first SuperLiga goal in second fixture match, against Radnički Niš. During the 2016–17 season, Ćalasan made 32 matches at total in all competitions under coach Andrey Chernyshov.

During the 2017–18 season, Ćalasan made 31 appearances in both domestic competitions under coaches Aleksandar Veselinović and Vladimir Gaćinović, finishing at the 4th place of the SuperLiga table. Ćalasan made his first continental appearance in the first leg of the First qualifying round for 2018–19 UEFA Europa League campaign, against Coleraine, pairing with Dejan Kerkez as a centre-back. In the first match of the next round, played  on 26 July 2018, Ćalasan scored for 2–0 win against Sparta Prague.

Chaves
On 12 January 2019, it was announced that Ćalasan signed a three-and-a-half year contract with Primeira Liga club Chaves.

International career
Ćalasan was called in Serbia U20 national squad by coach Nenad Lalatović, and made his debut for the team in a match against Montenegro in November 2016. At the beginning of 2017, he also received a call from Serbia national football team coach, Slavoljub Muslin, for a friendly match against United States on 29 January 2017, when he made a debut for the team. Ćalasan got his first call in Serbian under-21 team by coach Goran Đorović in September 2017. He made his debut for the team in away friendly against Qatar on 17 December 2017.

Career statistics

Club

International

References

External links
 
 
 
 

1996 births
Living people
Sportspeople from Subotica
Association football defenders
Serbian footballers
Serbian expatriate footballers
Serbia youth international footballers
Serbia under-21 international footballers
FK Bačka 1901 players
FK Spartak Subotica players
G.D. Chaves players
Leixões S.C. players
Serbian SuperLiga players
Primeira Liga players
Liga Portugal 2 players
Serbian expatriate sportspeople in Portugal
Expatriate footballers in Portugal
Serbia international footballers